Bergset is the administrative centre of Rendalen Municipality in Innlandet county, Norway.

Bergset was also the administrative centre of the former municipality of Øvre Rendal which is now a part of Rendalen. Øvre Rendal Church, built in 1761, is located in Bergset. The Rendalen Village Museum in Bergset contains a collection relating to the author Jacob Breda Bull (1853–1930), who was a resident of Rendalen. Bull was buried in the nearby Ytre Rendal Church.

References

External links
Rendalen Bygdemuseum website

Rendalen
Villages in Innlandet